Softener may refer to:

 Fabric softener, a conditioner that is typically applied to laundry during the rinse cycle in a washing machine.
 Stool softener, anionic surfactants that enable additional water and fats to be incorporated in the stool, making it easier for them to move through the gastrointestinal tract.
 Water softener, removes calcium, magnesium, and certain other metal cations in hard water.
 Softener ball, a special plastic ball used to dispense liquid fabric softener in clothes washing machines that lack built-in softener dispensers.

See also
 
 Soft (disambiguation)